Kuntur Wayi or Kuntur Wayin (Quechua kuntur condor, Ancash Quechua wayi house, "condor house", -n a suffix, also spelled Condorhuayi; Condor Huayin, Cóndor Huain, Condor-Huain, Condorhuain, Cóndorhuain)  may refer to:

 Kuntur Wayi or Kuntur Wayin, a mountain in the Bolognesi Province, Ancash Region, Peru
 Kuntur Wayin, a mountain in the Lima Region, Peru
 Kuntur Wayin (Junín), a mountain in the Junín Region, Peru
 Kuntur Wayin (Recuay), a mountain in the Recuay Province, Ancash Region, Peru

See also 
 Kuntur Wasi (disambiguation)